Rapids are sections of a river where the river bed has a relatively steep gradient, causing an increase in water velocity and turbulence. Flow, gradient, constriction, and obstacles are four factors that are needed for a rapid to be created. 

Rapids are hydrological features between a run (a smoothly flowing part of a stream) and a cascade. Rapids are characterized by the river becoming shallower with some rocks exposed above the flow surface. As flowing water splashes over and around the rocks, air bubbles become mixed in with it and portions of the surface acquire a white color, forming what is called "whitewater". Rapids occur where the bed material is highly resistant to the erosive power of the stream in comparison with the bed downstream of the rapids. Very young streams flowing across solid rock may be rapids for much of their length. Rapids cause water aeration of the stream or river, resulting in better water quality.

Rapids are categorized in classes, generally running from I to VI. A Class 5 rapid may be categorized as Class 5.1-5.9. While Class I rapids are easy to navigate and require little maneuvering, Class VI rapids pose threat to life with little or no chance for rescue. River rafting sports are carried out where many rapids are present in the course.

Physical Factors 
As mentioned before, in order for a rapid to form there needs to be a gradient, which is essentially the downhill slope of a stream or river.  When a river has a larger gradient, the water flows downhill faster. Gradients are typically measured in feet per mile. This impacts the river's flow or discharge, which is measured as a volume of water per unit of time. The faster the water flows, there more likely for a rapid to form. Constriction refers to when rivers flow through narrower channels, thus increasing the velocity of the water. This may also lead to the creation of obstructions due to sediment transportation and erosion. Obstacles may occur by human activity, natural landslides and earthquakes, or accumulation of sediment or debris. The more prominent these four factors are present in a river, the more likely that river is to be a rapid river.

See also 
Fluid dynamics
International scale of river difficulty - for classification of rapids
Rheophile - organisms that live in fast-flowing water
Riffle - A fast-moving portion of a stream without the vigor of a rapid
River rapids ride

References

External links
 Rapids entry in National Geographic's encyclopedia

 
Fluvial landforms
Limnology
Rivers
Water streams